The 1994 Michigan Secretary of State election was held on November 8, 1994. Republican nominee Candice Miller narrowly defeated incumbent Democrat Richard H. Austin with 53.56% of the vote.

General election

Candidates
Major party candidates
Candice Miller, Republican
Richard H. Austin, Democratic

Results

References

1994 Michigan elections
Michigan Secretary of State elections
Michigan
November 1994 events in the United States